Maria Zilda Bethlem (born October 20, 1951), also known as Maria Zilda, is a Brazilian actress. She is known for the role of Verônica in the Rede Globo telenovela Vereda Tropical.

She won the Best Actress Award at the 1993 Brasília Film Festival for her performance in Vagas para Moças de Fino Trato, also winning the same award at the 2000 Gramado Film Festival for her role in Eu Não Conhecia Tururu.

She was married to television director Roberto Talma, with whom she had her younger son, filmmaker Raphael Vieira. She is also the mother of politician Rodrigo Bethlem from a previous marriage. Rodrigo is the father of her granddaughter, Vitória. In October 2013, it publicly revealed its marriage, that occurred in 2008, with the architect Ana Kalil. In May 2017, she announced that she is separated, during an interview with TV Fama program.

Filmography

References

External links

1951 births
20th-century Brazilian actresses
21st-century Brazilian actresses
Actresses from Rio de Janeiro (city)
Brazilian film actresses
Brazilian stage actresses
Brazilian television actresses
Brazilian LGBT actors
Living people